Baron Brougham and Vaux , of Brougham in the County of Westmorland and of High Head Castle in the County of Cumberland, is a title in the Peerage of the United Kingdom. It was created in 1860 for the lawyer, Whig politician and former Lord Chancellor Henry Brougham, 1st Baron Brougham and Vaux, with remainder to his younger brother William Brougham. He had already been created Baron Brougham and Vaux, of Brougham in the County of Westmorland, in 1830, also in the Peerage of the United Kingdom, with normal remainder to the heirs male of his body.

On his death in 1868, the barony of 1830 became extinct as he had no sons, while he was succeeded in the barony of 1860 according to the special remainder by his brother William, who became the second Baron. William had earlier represented Southwark in the House of Commons. , the title is held by William's great-great-grandson, the fifth Baron, who succeeded his father in 1967. He is one of the ninety two elected hereditary peers that were allowed to remain in the House of Lords after the passing of the House of Lords Act 1999, and sits as a Conservative.

Barons Brougham and Vaux, first creation (1830)
Henry Peter Brougham, 1st Baron Brougham and Vaux (1778–1868)

Barons Brougham and Vaux, second creation (1860)
Henry Peter Brougham, 1st Baron Brougham and Vaux (1778–1868)
William Brougham, 2nd Baron Brougham and Vaux (1795–1886)
Henry Charles Brougham, 3rd Baron Brougham and Vaux (1836–1927)
Henry Brougham (1887–1927)
Victor Henry Peter Brougham, 4th Baron Brougham and Vaux (1909–1967)
Michael John Brougham, 5th Baron Brougham and Vaux (b. 1938)

The heir apparent is the present holder's son, Charles William Brougham (b. 1971).
The heir apparent's heir apparent is his son, Henry George Brougham (b. 2012).

Male-line family tree

Arms

Notes

References 

Baronies in the Peerage of the United Kingdom
Noble titles created in 1860
Extinct baronies in the Peerage of the United Kingdom
Noble titles created in 1830
Noble titles created for UK MPs
1830 establishments in the United Kingdom
1860 establishments in the United Kingdom
Peerages created with special remainders
Peerages created for the Lord High Chancellor of Great Britain